Distenia is a genus of Disteniid beetle.

Species

References

External links
 Encyclopedia of Life entry

Chrysomeloidea
Chrysomeloidea genera